Jon Gregory Litton (born July 13, 1964) is a former infielder-outfielder in Major League Baseball drafted by the San Francisco Giants in the 1st round (10th pick) of the  amateur draft. He played for the San Francisco Giants (-), Seattle Mariners, and Boston Red Sox.

Litton was a versatile utility man. The positions he played most often were second base, the outfield, and third base. He also played shortstop, first base, and  catcher, and even made one appearance as a pitcher. His personal high for playing time was during the  season, when he was in 93 games and made 220 plate appearances.

Greg is now divorced with two adult daughters, Morgan and Lauren.

On departing baseball Litton worked a with close friend as a jeweler. Soon after, Litton began a professional relationship with Pensacola businessman Quint Studer that led to opportunities as an announcer for the MiLB AA Pensacola Blue Wahoos (a Cincinnati Reds affiliate) and as an inspirational speaker for the Studer Group. Litton now works for Primary Residential Mortgage, Inc. as a loan originator.

Political Activity 
In 2004, Litton ran for office to serve as the Escambia County Supervisor of Elections. He lost to David Stafford in the Republican primary.

In 2018, Litton ran for an open County Commission seat in Escambia County. Litton lost in the Republican primary, garnering less than 20% of the vote.

In 2022, Litton ran for a seat in the Florida House of Representatives. Litton challenged incumbent Alex Andrade in the Republican primary. Litton again lost in the Republican primary, garnering less than 21% of the vote.

Career highlights
Litton holds the major league record for positions played during his career, having played all nine.
Batted .500 (3-for-6) in the 1989 World Series against the Oakland Athletics, including a two-run homer in Game 4 off reliever Gene Nelson
Pitched in the 9th inning of 14-6 loss to Houston Astros, giving up one earned run (July 4, 1991)
Eight 3-hit games, with the most impressive being two doubles and a home run against the Chicago Cubs (May 15, 1992)
A pinch-hit grand slam in the top of the 13th inning to defeat the Cincinnati Reds (October 4, 1992)
Two doubles, good for four runs batted in, against the Kansas City Royals (September 16, 1993)
Hit a combined .417 (20-for-48) against All-Star pitchers Norm Charlton, Danny Jackson, Greg Maddux, and Frank Viola

He finished his career with a lifetime batting average of .241, 13 HR, 97 RBI, and 78 runs scored in 374 ballgames.

References

External links

Retrosheet

1964 births
Living people
San Francisco Giants players
Seattle Mariners players
Boston Red Sox players
Baseball players from Louisiana
Major League Baseball infielders
Major League Baseball outfielders
Major League Baseball second basemen
Pensacola State Pirates baseball players
Tacoma Rainiers players
American expatriate baseball players in Canada
Calgary Cannons players
Everett Giants players
Fresno Giants players
Pawtucket Red Sox players
Phoenix Firebirds players
Shreveport Captains players